Justice King may refer to:

 Arno W. King, associate justice of the Maine Supreme Judicial Court
 Edwin King, former judge president of the Western Cape, South Africa, who headed the 2000 Commission of Inquiry into Cricket Match Fixing and Related Matters
 George Edwin King, puisne justice of the Supreme Court of Canada
 George Rogers King, associate justice of the Louisiana Supreme Court
 James Lawrence King, associate justice of the Florida Supreme Court
 John Hamilton King, associate justice of the Connecticut Supreme Court
 John W. King, associate justice and chief justice of the New Hampshire Supreme Court
 Len King (1925–2011), puisne justice and chief justice of the Supreme Court of South Australia
 Leslie D. King, associate justice of the Mississippi Supreme Court
 Peter King, 1st Baron King, chief justice of the Common Pleas and Lord Chancellor of England
 William H. King, associate justice of the Utah Supreme Court
 William R. King (judge), associate justice of the Oregon Supreme Court